Fisch is a German language occupational surname, which means "fisherman" or "fish seller", derived from the Middle High German visch, meaning "fish". The name may refer to:

Arline Fisch (born 1931), American artist
Asher Fisch (born 1958), Israeli conductor
Bernhard Fisch (1926–2020), German writer
Edith Fisch (1923–2006), American legal scholar
Erika Fisch (1934–2021), German athlete
Hans Ulrich Fisch (1583–1647), Swiss painter
Isidor Fisch (1905–1934), German associate of Bruno Hauptmann
Jill Fisch, American professor at the University of Pennsylvania Law School
Jedd Fisch (born 1976), American football coach
Klaus Fisch (1893–1975), German painter
Menachem Fisch (born 1948), Israeli philosopher
Olga Fisch (born 1901), artist and rugmaker
Richard Fisch (1926–2011), American psychiatrist
Robert O. Fisch (1925–2022), Hungarian-born American pediatrician

See also
Fish (surname)
Fysh, surname

References

German-language surnames
Jewish surnames
Occupational surnames
Yiddish-language surnames
Surnames from nicknames